Linthicum station is a Baltimore Light Rail station in Linthicum Heights, Maryland. This station is the last station on the light rail's trunk line; southbound trains depart onto branches to BWI Marshall Airport station and Cromwell station. There is currently no free public parking or bus connections at this station.

Linthicum station uses a railroad line formerly served by the Baltimore and Annapolis Railroad. It is accessible from a long crosswalk across from the intersection of Camp Meade Road (MD 170) and Benton Avenue, and the Linthicum Volunteer Fire Company (Station #32). Another crosswalk to the station leads to Oakdale Road on the opposite side of the tracks. The station reopened again in 1993, and the spur to Marshall Airport was created in 1997.

Ridership at the station averages 372 people daily, 67% of whom are transfers to either BWI Airport or Cromwell station. Only 33% of riders are "walk-ups" from the surrounding neighborhood, according to a 2011-2012 study funded by the MTA.

There is an effort to close this station due to the crime the station is alleged to bring to its community, including an attempted murder. While MTA has not considered closing the station, other actions have been taken or considered. These include the placement of a call box where riders can alert police when in need, additional security cameras, and the early closing of the station at 8 pm. Early attempts to have this stop closed date back to 1994.

Station layout

References

External links
Schedules
 Camp Meade Road entrance from Google Maps Street View
 Oakdale Road entrance from Google Maps Street View

Baltimore Light Rail stations
Linthicum, Maryland
Railway stations in the United States opened in 1993
1993 establishments in Maryland
Railway stations in Anne Arundel County, Maryland
Railway stations in the United States opened in 1887